= Franziska Gänsler =

Franziska Gänsler (born 1987 Augsburg) is a German writer. She was shortlisted for the Blogbuster Prize.

== Works ==
- Gänsler, Franziska (2022-07-19). Ewig Sommer (in German). Zürich: Kein & Aber. ISBN 978-3-0369-5881-1.
  - Gänsler, Franziska (2025-05-06). Eternal Summer. Translated by Imogen Taylor. New York: Other Press LLC. ISBN 978-1-63542-526-0.
